Tashirobae Dam  is a gravity dam located in Miyazaki Prefecture in Japan. The dam is used for flood control, water supply and power production. The catchment area of the dam is 131.5 km2. The dam impounds about 102  ha of land when full and can store 19270 thousand cubic meters of water. The construction of the dam was started on 1971 and completed in 1999.

See also
List of dams in Japan

References

Dams in Miyazaki Prefecture